Zombi Kampung Pisang (Kampung Pisang's Zombies) is a 2007 Malaysian Malay-language horror comedy film directed by Mamat Khalid. The whole story happens in one night, taking place in a village named Kampung Pisang ("Banana Village" in Malay) and its surroundings. (The dialect used by the characters suggests that the village is located somewhere in rural Perak - the director himself hails from this state.)

Plot
The story starts when Husin is asked by few village boys on his way home to hang out with them during their guitar playing sessions. Husin decides to join them. Eventually they get spotted and is given a scolding by an elder named Pak Abu, who was on his way back home from the mosque after the Isyak prayers.

Halfway through his scolding of them, Pak Abu suddenly freezes in motion and falls, at which point Husin and the other boys carry Pak Abu home. Mat Karen calls the head of the village to Pak Abu's house. Things turn chaotic when Pak Jabit, the village head, is also knocked out. They then decide to call the village's medical assistant Sofi. Sofi checks both Pak Abu and Pak Jabit and declares them both already dead. While they discuss what happened, Pak Abu's daughter Muna screams in horror - the bodies of Pak Abu and Pak Jabit have somehow disappeared.

Shocked with the incident, Husin and Sofi rush to their community centre and drum on the old bedok to gather the villagers. After they inform the villagers of these events, some of the villagers start to speculate of the paranormal activities that might be happening around them. Their fears soon become a reality: zombies start to appear all across the village, the victims encountering them with hilarious results.

Cast 
 Awie as Husin
 Ezlynn as Maimon
 Que Haidar as Deris
 AC Mizal Mat Karan
 Soffi Jikan as Sofi
 Hamid Gurkha as Pak Mail
 Nadia Mustafar as Munah
 Man Kadir as Pak Jabit
 Zami Ismail as Pak Abu
 Ruminah Sidek as Mak Som Jamaliah
 Usop Wilcha as Usop
 Lan Pet Pet as Inspector Cenehom
 Loloq as A. Kamsan
 Jalil Hamid as Pak Munawir
 Dewa Sapri as Cik Purnama
 Ilya Buang as Konstabel Fauzi/Pian RELA
 Hamdan Ramli as Chief District Police
 Mamat Khalid as MK (special appearance)

Sequels 
 Hantu Kak Limah Balik Rumah (2010)
 Hantu Kak Limah: Husin, Mon dan Jin Pakai Toncit (2013)
 Zombie Kilang Biskut (2014)
 Hantu Kak Limah (2018)

References

External links
 

2008 films
2000s comedy horror films
Malaysian comedy horror films
Zombie comedy films
Films directed by Mamat Khalid
Films with screenplays by Mamat Khalid
Tayangan Unggul films
Films produced by Gayatri Su-Lin Pillai
2007 comedy films
2007 films
2008 comedy films
Malaysian zombie films